

List of countries

Austria
Austrian Bundesliga

Ziad El Sheiwi – Austria Wien

Canada
Major League Soccer

Ahmed Hamdi – Montréal

Cyprus
Cyta Championship

Amr Warda – Anorthosis Famagusta

Denmark
Danish Superliga
Emam Ashour – Midtjylland

England
Premier League

Mohamed Salah – Liverpool  
Mohamed Elneny – Arsenal

EFL League One

Sam Morsy – Ipswich Town

National League North

Ahmed Salam – Alfreton Town

France
Ligue 1

Mostafa Mohamed – Nantes

Germany
Bundesliga

Omar Marmoush – VfL Wolfsburg
Mohammed Tolba – VfL Bochum

3. Liga

Amin Farouk- SV Wehen Wiesbaden

Youth Leagues

Moustafa Ashraf Moustafa – Borussia Mönchengladbach U19 
Omar Megeed – Hamburger SV U19
Abdel-Rehim Soliman – Energie Cottbus U17

Greece 
Super League Greece 2

Bilal Mazhar – Panathinaikos B

Latvia
Latvijas futbola 2. līga

Ziad Moustafa – Mārupes SC Futbols

Norway

4. divisjon

Sabri Khattab – Tistedalens

Poland
II liga

Abdallah Hafez – Górnik Polkowice

Qatar
Qatar Stars League

Ahmed Aboutrika – Al-Arabi 
Louay Ashoor – Al-Markhiya
Yousef Ramadan – Al-Markhiya
Saif Aboutrika – Qatar

Romania
Liga II

Omar El Sawy – Csíkszereda Miercurea Ciuc

Saudi Arabia
Saudi Professional League

Ahmed Hegazi – Al-Ittihad
Tarek Hamed – Al-Ittihad
Noureddine El Bahhar – Al-Ittihad

Scotland
Scottish League One

Ramez Hefzalla – Peterhead

Spain
Segunda División

Haissem Hassan – Villarreal B

Preferente

Nader Ghabbour  – Moscardó

Sweden
Superettan

Ahmed Bonnah – Östers

Turkey
Süper Lig

Koka – Alanyaspor
Trézéguet – Trabzonspor

United Arab Emirates
UAE Pro-League

Abdalla Al Refaey – Al Wahda
Ahmed Refaat – Al Wahda

Egyptian players won titles in European clubs
Bold: Still playing competitive football in Europe

See also
 Egyptian Football Association
 Egyptian Premier League
 Egypt Cup
 EFA League Cup
 Egyptian Super Cup
 Egypt national football team
 Egypt national under-23 football team
 Egypt national under-20 football team
 Egypt national under-17 football team
 List of football clubs in Egypt

References

players in foreign leagues
Egyptian expatriate footballers
Egyptian footballers
Association football player non-biographical articles